USS Canandaigua may refer to:

, was a screw sloop in service from 1862 until 1875
, was a minelayer, which served from 1918 until 1919
, was an auxiliary vessel which only served for 2 months in 1945 before sinking
, was a submarine chaser in service from 1943 until 1947 and named Canandaigua in 1956

United States Navy ship names